Mount Lawley is an electorate in the state of Western Australia. Mount Lawley is named for the inner north-eastern Perth suburb of Mount Lawley, which falls within its borders.

The seat was created at the 2007 redistribution from parts of Yokine and Perth, and has a long history in an earlier incarnation which existed from 1950 until 1989 as a reasonably safe Liberal Party seat which was held for 22 years by Ray O'Connor, who served as Premier in 1982–1983, although is now a marginal seat. It falls within the Electoral region of East Metropolitan.

As well as Mount Lawley, the suburbs of Yokine, Menora and Coolbinia are part of the district, as are sections of Dianella and Inglewood. Mount Lawley is bounded by Morley Drive, The Strand, Walter Road West, Eighth Avenue, Carrington Street, Central Avenue, Swan River foreshore, Summers Street, Lord Street, Walcott Street and Wanneroo Road.

History
The original seat of Mount Lawley was created at the 1948 redistribution, at which three new metropolitan electorates were created to replace former northern and agricultural seats in Parliament. Its first member was elected at the 1950 election, and it was always a safe seat for the Liberal Party. At the redistribution, the neighbouring seat of North Perth became a Labor seat with booths from the abolished Perth electorate, so Arthur Abbott, the Liberal member for North Perth since 1939, contested and won Mount Lawley. He was ultimately defeated in the 1956 election by the Liberal member for Maylands, Edward Oldfield, who had resigned from the Liberal Party to contest the election. In the 1962 election, following another redistribution, Oldfield returned to Maylands, whilst North Perth MLA Ray O'Connor won in Mount Lawley. He was to serve the district for 22 years, and the State as a minister in the Court government and ultimately as Premier of Western Australia from 25 January 1982 until 19 February 1983. He resigned his seat the following year, and George Cash won the resulting by-election. The seat was abolished in the 1988 redistribution and divided between Maylands, Dianella and Perth.

The seat was recreated in the 2007 redistribution on similar boundaries to its original incarnation. The seat of Yokine, which covered much of the original Mount Lawley's area, was held by Liberal minister Dr Kim Hames until the 2001 election, when he was defeated by the Labor candidate and former Assistant Police Commissioner Bob Kucera. After it became clear Kucera did not have Premier Alan Carpenter's support, Kucera did not contest Labor preselection for the 2008 election, and journalist Karen Brown won the nomination unopposed. In June 2008, Kucera resigned from the Labor Party and expressed an intention to contest either Nollamara or Mount Lawley as an independent, though he ultimately contested neither. The 2008 state election saw Brown defeated by Liberal candidate Michael Sutherland.

Members for Mount Lawley

Election results

References

External links
 

Mount Lawley